Elvira Salazar (born 16 July 1958) is a Colombian sports shooter. She competed in the women's 25 metre pistol event at the 1984 Summer Olympics.

References

1958 births
Living people
Colombian female sport shooters
Olympic shooters of Colombia
Shooters at the 1984 Summer Olympics
Place of birth missing (living people)